Louis-Israël Fréchette (né Côté; May 6, 1848 – July 17, 1923) was a merchant and political figure in Quebec. He represented Mégantic in the House of Commons of Canada from 1882 to 1884 and from 1891 to 1896 as a Conservative member. His name appears as Louis-Israël Côté alias Fréchette in English sources.

He was born in Saint-Ferdinand, Canada East to Louis Coté and was educated there. Fréchette married Léda Bernier. He served as postmaster and mayor of St-Ferdinand d'Halifax. His election to the House of Commons in 1882 was declared void in 1884 and François Langelier was elected in the by-election which followed.  Fréchette ran unsuccessfully for reelection to the House of Commons in 1896, 1900, 1904 and 1908.

References 
 
 The Canadian parliamentary companion, 1891, JA Gemmill

1848 births
1923 deaths
Members of the House of Commons of Canada from Quebec
Conservative Party of Canada (1867–1942) MPs
Mayors of places in Quebec
19th-century Canadian businesspeople
20th-century Canadian businesspeople